Kurrah the village of pathan or pashtoon Kamsaar in the Indian state of Uttar Pradesh. Almost 3900 Kamsaar Pathans lived in the village as of 2011.

History 
The Tajpur kurrah village was founded by Zamindar Usman khan a son of Narhar Khan founder of kamsar pathans and founder of Dildarnagar kamsar. Before Usman established this village his father Narhar Khan lived at a place in village name as Kamesardih. According to the old records of village it is said the village would be founded in late 1500 ADs. Later one of Usman's descendants shifted to Bihar and established Akhini village in Bihar state of India. On the banks of Karmanasa river. Tajpur village was The capital of Tajpur estate or Tajpur Zamindari which had 91 villages in year 1901 and had a total area spread of 165 Km².

Agriculture 
The village is situated at the banks of durgavati and karamnasa river and have good crop producing soil.
 The Karamanasa river passes 3.2 kilometer from the village. The total area of the village is 1112 acres out of which the total crop production area of the village is 1000 acres. A variety of crops grow in Purvanchal and Bihar. The village has tractors, harvester and balers. According to 2019 the total number of tractors in village was 45 and the total number of harvesters in the village was 6, and balers were 3. The village have three mosques and two temples. The village also have one play ground. Fish rearing is done on a large scale in the village. There are 20 ponds in village which cover more than 25 acres of land. The village also have one Eidgah. The village is also known as the village of Coconuts because during British era Coconut farming was don in the village on a large scale. More than 5000 trees of Coconuts were planted in the village during 1880s.

Plantation
When Zamindar Usman Khan established the village he build a large orchard here which was named Tajpur Bagh. The orchard was spread over an area of 275 bigha and had 8500 trees. Know the orchard build by him have an area of 205 bigha and have more than a thousand trees. Now the orchard is owned by the family of Usman Khan and some in know Jungle.

As of 2011 census, the main population of the village lives in an area of 111 acres  with the total number of 976 house holds.

Histrorical Population

Notable people
Khan Shein Kunwar, write
Nusrat ali khan,

References

Dildarnagar
Dildarnagar Fatehpur
Cities and towns in Ghazipur district
Towns and villages in Kamsar